Temarii Tinorua (born 19 May 1986) is a Tahitian footballer who plays as a midfielder for A.S. Tefana in the Tahiti Ligue 1.

International career

International goals
Scores and results list Tahiti's goal tally first.

References

1986 births
Living people
French Polynesian footballers
Association football midfielders
Tahiti international footballers
2016 OFC Nations Cup players